"The Dream Is Still Alive" is a song recorded by Wilson Phillips and released as a single in June 1991. The fifth and final single to be released from their debut album Wilson Phillips. "The Dream Is Still Alive" became first release from album to fail to achieve top 10 status on the Billboard Hot 100, peaking at number 12.

Charts

Weekly charts

Year-end charts

References

1991 singles
Wilson Phillips songs
1991 songs
SBK Records singles
Pop ballads
Song recordings produced by Glen Ballard
Songs written by Glen Ballard